Holzdorf is a village in the municipality of Jessen (Elster) in the district of Wittenberg in the German state of Saxony-Anhalt. It has 1,155 inhabitants (2021). Previously a separate municipality in the district of Kremitz, it became part of the amalgamated municipality of Jessen on 1 March 2004.

Holzdorf, with various shops and doctors' offices, is a regional center for the surrounding villages.  In addition to farming, the nearby Schönewalde/Holzdorf Air Base with about 400 staff, is the main source of income of the residents. The air base itself is within the city Schönewalde in Brandenburg.

References

External links 
  Stadt Jessen (Elster)

Former municipalities in Saxony-Anhalt
Jessen (Elster)